Mário Gentil Quina, GOIH (1 January 1930 – 8 September 2017) was a Portuguese sailor. He competed at the 1952, 1960, 1968 and 1972 Olympics, and served as the Olympic flag bearer for Portugal in 1960. In 1952 he finished 17th in one-person dingy. In 1960 he won a silver medal in the star class, together with his brother José Manuel Quina; the brothers placed 17th at the 1968 Games. In 1972 he took part in the three-person keelboat event, together with his another brother Francisco Quina and finished 21st.

Quina mostly competed in the star class (doubles) and participated in seven world championships between 1953 and 1967. He won a bronze medal in this category at the 1965 European Championships.

Awards
Olympic Medal Nobre Guedes (1960)
  Grand Officer of the Order of Prince Henry

References

1930 births
2017 deaths
Sportspeople from Lisbon
Portuguese male sailors (sport)
Sailors at the 1952 Summer Olympics – Finn
Sailors at the 1960 Summer Olympics – Star
Sailors at the 1968 Summer Olympics – Star
Sailors at the 1972 Summer Olympics – Dragon
Olympic sailors of Portugal
Olympic silver medalists for Portugal
Olympic medalists in sailing
Medalists at the 1960 Summer Olympics